Philip Chan Yan-kin (born 25 January 1945) is a Hong Kong actor, film director, producer, screenwriter and music composer of Taishan area origin.

Career

He worked as a Royal Hong Kong Police Force police inspector before entering the entertainment industry. His most memorable moment as a police inspector was during a press conference he held with members of Hong Kong's press at the scene of the 1974 Po Sang Bank robbery, which was one of the biggest bank robbery cases up until then in Hong Kong history. He resigned as a Superintendent of Police in 1976 to join Bang Bang Films as a Producer and simultaneously headed its Advertising Department, marketing the then very popular jeans and apparel brand-name in Hong Kong.

Chan first made his popularity in the then British Colony of Hong Kong by being the lead vocalist for the first all-Chinese college pop group, "The Astro-Notes" (taken after the Astronauts representing the US and the Sputniks representing the USSR during the space race in the early 60s. He became a household name when he joined the Royal Hong Kong Police in 1965 by displaying courage and leadership in solving several sensational, major crime cases in the British Colony, including the first ever armed bank robbery in 1974 in which 11 hostages were held at ransom. He was nicknamed the "Singing Inspector" when he wrote the lyrics and went on TV to promote road safety for school children. His success in police work earned him a quick promotion to Superintendent of Police in 1975.

In 1976, he was invited by actress Josephine Siu (Siu Fong Fong) and director Pochi Leung to write a police screenplay involving heroin trafficking between Amsterdam and Hong Kong, "Jumping Ash". The upbeat detective movie hit an instant box-office success in 1976, grossing one million dollars in three days and caused the young policeman to consider pursuing his greatest love of his life, films and music. . He resigned from public service to head the film production department and marketing department for Bang Bang Group, which was then the most successful jeans company in Hong Kong. He also took the helm in producing two popular youth programs on Hong Kong Television Broadcasting Limited and the then Rediffusion Television respectively to promote Bang Bang Fashion. He went on to become a renowned actor, script-writer, director and producer, with 14 films under his direction from 1976 to 1990. He is the Honorable Lifetime Chairman of the Hong Kong Film Director's Guild and an Honorable committee member of the Hong Kong Performing Artistes Guild. He was also one of the principal emcees in Hong Kong's leading television station, Hong Kong Television Broadcasting Limited (TVB) for over 15 years.

Intending to strengthen his skills in Management and Marketing, he spent less and less time in acting and producing and eventually became a fully fledged executive working for several commercial conglomerates in Hong Kong:-
1980s general manager, Capital Artist Company (華星娛樂唱片公司) – creating numerous hits and propelling a string of singers into super stardom, including Aaron Kwok (郭富城), Sammi Cheng (鄭秀文), Andy Hui (許志安), Edmond Leung (梁漢文) and Coco Lee (李玟).
1990s managing director, Metro Broadcasts Limited (香港新城電臺) – Hong Kong’s youngest radio station, owned by business tycoon Li Ka Shing was running on loss for five consecutive years since it opened. It was during this time that he produced numerous stage award shows and events that gave Metro Broadcast the success and increase in revenue that was long overdue. In three years he turned the business around. 
Late 1990s until early 2000, chief operating officer, Star East Group (東方魅力集團) – a stars/celebrities owned company engaged in the running of themed restaurants (including the then very successful Planet Hollywood). Philip was involved in the opening of the Star East Entertainment complexes in Hong Kong, Guangzhou and the driver of the franchised project in Chengdu. The Group has been sold to another listed company in 2002.
Since 2000 Proprietor and chief operating officer, Endless Idea Management Limited – A promoter of concerts and event marketing in Hong Kong. Apart from supplying Hong Kong stars’ performances and concerts to Mainland China, Singapore, Malaysia and Atlantic City, he also produced the very popular Winter Wonderland in Tsuen Wan for Sino Properties and the same show was, by demand, produced in Donguan, China.
2003–2005 He was the chief executive officer, Mandarin Films (東方電影).
2005–2007 chief operating officer, Emperor Motion Pictures (英皇電影). Once again he became a front-line filmmaker with the opening up of the China market. He simultaneously headed the Emperor Films/Shanghai Film Group joint-venture, the SFG Emperor Film Company (上映英皇电影有限公司)in Shanghai. During this period he produced two films, “Home Run” (回家的路)and the comedy ”The Fantastic Water babes” (出水芙蓉).

Since 1999 he started his penetration into the entertainment market of Mainland China in the fields of television production (the starting up of the Lucky Paid TV Channel in Shanghai), film production (for Emperor Films in the movie "Home Run" and its subsequent distribution. He acted as a consultant for the Canadian independent horror film “Walking the Dead” which was shot on location in Heibei, Northern China in 2009.

For 32 years, he has been one of Hong Kong’s top masters of ceremony and show host. His unique style is the result of his congenial style and personality, his energy and humour. His TV appearances include “The Return Of Hong Kong’s Sovereignty to China”; the annual main Hong Kong beauty pageant “The Miss Hong Kong Pageant”; and the “Eastern China Flood Relief Charity Gala”  at the People’s Hall in Beijing to “Miss Playboy International”.

He is the chairman and chief executive officer of Endless Idea Management (Hong Kong) Limited and Fantasia Entertainment Production Group (Macao) Company Limited. These companies engage in event planning and production for major Casinos and Hotels in Macao and Mainland China. He has also formed a new film company, Good Earth Films, to consult and produce for overseas and Chinese film companies in Mainland China, Hong Kong and Taiwan.

Chan is the CEO of Endless Idea Management (Hong Kong) Limited and Endless Idea Management (International) Limited, companies which he founded in the 1990s. The two companies engage in the work of artists agent, variety event production, event management and film production consultancy. He is also the CEO of Grand Olympia Films (Hong Kong) Limited. He heads the development of several films to be jointly produced by Mainland China and Hong Kong film companies. One of these films, The Tiger and I, is under pre-production and is due for principal photography in October 2014.

Filmography

Actor

 Jumping Ash (1976)
 The Extra (1977)
 Foxbat (1977) – Lee
 Between the Twins (1978, TV Series)
 The Servant (1979) – Inspector Pang
 Shou kou (1979)
 Dian zhi bing bing (1979)
 Di er dao cai hong (1979) – Tsai Yung Tsung
 Encore (1980) – The Uncle
 Avengers from Hell (1981)
 A Can dang chai (1981)
 Long gan wei (1981)
 Chuang ban shen tan dian zi gui (1981)
 Hunting Head (1982) – Kim Tai-Yung
 Secret Ninja, Roaring Tiger (1982)
 Noigwon (1983)
 Gun Is Law (1983) – Chan Shing-Fung
 Winners and Sinners (1983) – Inspector
 The Return of the Condor Heroes (1983, TV Series) – Luk Jin-yuan
 Esprit d'amour (1983) – John Tang
 Red Panther (1983) – Lai's Superior
 Pom Pom (1984) – Inspector Chan
 The Return of Pom Pom (1984) – Inspector Chan
 San wen zhi (1984)
 The Owl vs Bombo (1984) – Cop
 Mr. Boo Meets Pom Pom (1985) – Inspector Chan
 Two Jolly Cops (1985)
 Twinkle, Twinkle, Lucky Stars (1985) – Person at the end #2
 Street Fighters Part II (1985)
 Night Caller (1985) – Steve Chan
 Duo bao ji shang ji (1986)
 Pom Pom Strikes Back (1986) – Inspector Chan
 The Romancing Star (1987) – Kenny
 Flaming Brothers (1987) – Chen
 Xiang Gang xiao jie xie zhen (1987) – Prosecutor Chan
 Crazy Spirit (1987) – Inspector Chen
 Ching yi sam (1988) – Chick
 Bloodsport (1988) – Captain Chen
 Hero of Tomorrow (1988) – Crow's Target
 City Warriors (1988) – Supt. Chan
 Jing cha ye yi min (1989)
 Xiao xiao xiao jing cha (1989)
 Carry On Yakuzas!! (1989) – Willie
 Eat a Bowl of Tea (1989) – Henry Wang
 Hoi sam gui miu ba (1989)
 The Immigrant Policeman (1989)
 Fatal Bet (1989)
 Widow Warriors (1990) – Liu Chuan-Hau
 Spy Games (1990) – Ken's Boss
 The Musical Vampire (1990)
 Pantyhose Hero (1990) – Officer Raiding Gay Bar
 The Tigers (1991) – Supt. Tsao Siu-Ping
 Double Impact (1991) – Raymond Zhang
 The Banquet (1991) – Policeman
 Sisters of the World Unite (1991)
 Twin Dragons (1992) – Hotel Manager Chen
 The Magic Touch (1992) – Commissioner David Ho
 Ngoh oi nau man choi (1992)
 Heart Against Hearts (1992) – Phillip
 Hard Boiled (1992) – Supt. Pang
 Police Story 3 (1992) – Insp. Y.K. Chen
 Fight Back to School III (1993) – Officer Chan
 Love on Delivery (1994) – Television Commercial Pitchman
 Nine Girls and a Ghost (2002)
 Good Times, Bed Times (2003)
 Home Run (2008)
 The Fantastic Water Babes (2008)
 Winner Takes It All (2012, Short)
 I Love The Way You Love Me (2013) – Host
 Inflection (2014)
 Tale of Three Cities (2015) – KMT Agent Chief (Shanghai)
 OCTB (2017, TV Series)
 Always (2015) – Gang Li
 The Big Call (2017) – Head of Hong Kong Police (final film role)

Director
1979: The Servants 牆內牆外
1981: Charlie's Bubbles 文仔的肥皂泡
1984: The Return of Pom Pom 雙龍出海
1985: Night Caller 平安夜
1986: Chocolate Inspector 神探朱古力
1986: Tongs, a Chinatown story 堂口故事
1986: Inspector Tuber 霹靂大喇叭
1986: From Here to Prosperity 奪寶計上計
1989: Carry On Yakuza 黑道福星
1989: Mr Sunshine 開心巨無霸
1990: Front Page 新半斤八兩

Producer or Production Adviser
1977: Foxbat 狐蝠
1978: The Extras 茄哩啡
1979: Cops and Robbers 點指兵兵
1980: Encore 喝采
1985: Mr Boo Meets Pom Pom 智勇三寶
1989: Path of Glory 沖天小子
2002: Nine Girls and a Ghost 九個女仔一隻鬼
2003: Cross Marriages in China 外地媳婦本地郎
2006: Hone Run 回家的路
2006: The Fantastic Water Babes 出水芙蓉
2011: 33 Postcards 幸福卡片
2014: The Tiger and I (in pre-production)

Scriptwriter
1975: Jumping Ash 跳灰
1977: Foxbat 狐蝠
1978: The Extras 茄哩啡
1979: Cops and Robers 點指兵兵
1981: Charlie's Bubbles 文仔的肥皂泡
1981: Krazy Kops 撞板神探電子龜
1984: Long Arm of the Law 省港旗兵
1986: Long Arm of the Law II 省港旗兵 II
1985: Night Caller 平安夜
1986: Chocolate Inspector 神探朱古力
1988: Edge of Darkness 陷阱邊沿
1989: Carry On Yakuzas 黑道福星
1989: Mr Sunshine 開心巨無霸
1989: Path of Glory 沖天小子
1990: Front Page 新半斤八兩
2014: The Tiger and I (in pre-production)

External links

hkcinemagic entry

Hong Kong male actors
Chan, Phillip
Chan, Phillip
Chan, Phillip
Chan, Phillip
Hong Kong film directors
1945 births
Living people
Hong Kong police officers
Hong Kong composers